The 2005 Bowling Green Falcons football team represented Bowling Green State University in the 2005 NCAA Division I-A football season. The team was coached by Gregg Brandon and played their home games in Doyt Perry Stadium in Bowling Green, Ohio. It was the 87th season of play for the Falcons.

Schedule

Roster

Season summary

Toledo

References

Bowling Green
Bowling Green Falcons football seasons
Bowling Green Falcons football